Children of the Sun is the 1969 album by British folk duo The Sallyangie; siblings Mike and Sally Oldfield. The album was produced by Nathan Joseph, founder of the record label Transatlantic Records. The album was reissued in 2002, with bonus tracks and a second disc, and again reissued on 26 September 2011 by Esoteric Recordings.

The album pre-dates Mike Oldfield's debut solo album, Tubular Bells, by 4 years and Sally Oldfield's Water Bearer by 9 years.

Track listing 
All songs written by Mike and Sally Oldfield

Original release 
 "Strangers" – 1:32
 "Lady Mary" – 3:41
 "Children of the Sun" – 4:56
 "A Lover for All Seasons" – 3:42
 "River Song" – 3:40
 "Banquet on the Water" – 4:28
 "Balloons" – 5:28
 "Midsummer Night's Happening" – 4:08
 "Love in Ice Crystals" – 3:00
 "Changing Colours" – 0:21
 "Chameleon" – 2:20
 "Milk Bottle" – 0:31
 "Murder of the Children of San Francisco" – 4:00
 "Strangers (reprise)" – 1:12

Re-issue 
 Disc 1
 "Strangers" (1:17)
 "Lady Mary" (3:43)
 "Children of the Sun" (5:06)
 "A Lover for All Seasons" (3:43)
 "River Song" (3:41)
 "Banquet on the Water" (4:44)
 "Balloons" (5:29)
 "Midsummer Night's Happening" (4:12)
 "Love in Ice Crystals" (3:06)
 "Changing Colours" (0:25)
 "Chameleon" (2:26)
 "Milk Bottle" (0:35)
 "The Murder of the Children of San Francisco" (4:00)
 "Twilight Song" (2:35)
 "The Song of the Healer" (3:03)
 "Strangers" (1:13)

 Disc 2
 "Children of the Sun" (minus intro) (4:11)
 "Mrs Moon and the Thatched Shop" (6:18)
 "Branches" (6:54)
 "A Sad Song for Rosie" (2:14)
 "Colours of the World" (2:30)
 "Two Ships" (3:17)
 "Child of Allah" (Only on the 2011 reissue) (2:55)
 "Lady Go Lightly" (Only on the 2011 reissue) (3:03)

Personnel 
 Sally Oldfield: vocals
 Mike Oldfield: acoustic guitar, vocals
 Terry Cox: percussion
 David Palmer: arrangement
 Ray Warleigh: flute

References

External links 
 

1969 debut albums
The Sallyangie albums
Transatlantic Records albums
Albums produced by Nathan Joseph